Easley House, also known as "The Breezes," is a historic home located at Bluefield, Mercer County, West Virginia.  It was designed by architect Alex B. Mahood, and built between 1919 and 1922. It is a stone, -story, Tudor Revival-style dwelling with a one-story conservatory wing. It has irregular massing and a projecting gable. Also on the property is a two-story side gable stone garage.

It was listed on the National Register of Historic Places in 1992.

References

Alex B. Mahood buildings
Houses in Mercer County, West Virginia
Houses completed in 1922
Houses on the National Register of Historic Places in West Virginia
National Register of Historic Places in Mercer County, West Virginia
Tudor Revival architecture in West Virginia
Buildings and structures in Bluefield, West Virginia